Amauroderma is a genus of polypore fungi in the family Ganodermataceae. The genus, widespread in tropical areas, contains about 70 species. Amauroderma fungi are wood-decay fungi that feed and fruit on decayed branches and trunks.

The fruit bodies of Amauroderma fungi comprise a cap and a stipe, and are typically woody, leathery, or corky in texture. The spores produced are usually spherical or nearly so, with a characteristic double wall structure that features U-shaped thickenings.

Taxonomy
Amauroderma was circumscribed by American mycologist William Alphonso Murrill in 1905. He set Amauroderma regulicolor (previously known as Fomes regulicolor Berk. ex Cooke), collected from Cuba, as the type species. The name Amauroderma had been used previously by Narcisse Patouillard, when he proposed that Ganoderma be divided into the sections Ganoderma and Amauroderma. Patouillard described the characteristics of section Amauroderma as follows: "Spores globose or subglobose, devoid of truncated base, warty, woodruff or smooth; crust hat or dull stipe pruinose, rarely shining." In 1920, Torrend promoted Ganoderma sect. Amauroderma to generic status, with Amauroderma auriscalpium as the type. This resulted in an illegitimate homonym, as Murrill's earlier usage of the name has priority.

Several studies using molecular phylogenetics have shown that Amauroderma, as currently circumscribed, is not a monophyletic taxon and will need to be revised.

Description
The fruit bodies of Amauroderma species are stipitate except in A. andina and may attain various shapes although centrally stipitate basidiocarps are most common. Several stipes may arise from the same base, frequently resulting in fused caps and compound fruit bodies. In section some fruit bodies are distinct with one or two distinct inner black bands or zones. The stipe is often duplex with an outer dense layer surrounding an inner softer or hollow core sometimes separated by a black band. In species with a distinct tomentum on the stipe, there is often a dark zone just below the tomentum of the cap. These zones are absent from some species with a pale stipe without a tomentum. However, when present they continue into the context and frequently there is also another zone stretching more or less horizontally across the context.

Most basidiospores of Amauroderma mushrooms have an inner ornamented wall on which there is a hyaline (translucent) epicutis, which is very thin and difficult to see in ordinary microscopic preparations. Mature basidiospores are pale-yellowish. An apiculus (a depressed area where the spore was once attached to the basidium via the sterigma) is often difficult to observe.

Chemistry
Amauroderma camerarium produces the anti-Trichomonas vaginalis protein that has been named amaurocine.

Habitat and distribution
Amauroderma is widespread in tropical areas. Twenty species have been recorded from Brazil; six have been confirmed in China. A collection of Amauroderma sprucei made in Florida in 2016 was the first recorded time that the genus has been collected in the United States.

Amauroderma schomburgkii, A. coltricioides, and A. calcigenum are examples of the genus that have been found fruiting on soil. Amauroderma schomburgkii is the most common neotropical species.

Species

The tenth edition of the Dictionary of the Fungi (2008) indicated that were about 30 species in the genus. , Index Fungorum accepts 68 species of Amauroderma.

Amauroderma africana Ryvarden (2004)
Amauroderma albostipitatum A.C.Gomes-Silva, Ryvarden & T.B.Gibertoni (2015) – Brazil
Amauroderma amoiense J.D.Zhao & L.W.Hsu (1983)
Amauroderma andina Ryvarden (2004)
Amauroderma argenteofulvum (Van der Byl) Doidge (1950) – Africa
Amauroderma auriscalpium (Berk.) Torrend (1920)
Amauroderma austrosinense J.D.Zhao & L.W.Hsu (1984)
Amauroderma aurantiacum (Torrend) Gibertoni & Bernicchia (2008) – Brazil; Venezuela
Amauroderma bataanense Murrill (1908) – Philippines
Amauroderma boleticeum  (Pat. & Gaillard) Torrend (1920) – South America
Amauroderma brasiliense  (Singer) Ryvarden (2004) – Brazil; Guyana; Venezuela
Amauroderma buloloi Aoshima (1971)
Amauroderma calcigenum (Berk.) Torrend (1920) – South America
Amauroderma calcitum D.H.Costa Rezende & E.R.Drechsler-Santos (2016) – Brazil
Amauroderma camerarium (Berk.) J.S.Furtado (1968) – Brazil, Belize, Colombia, Cuba, Honduras, Peru, Venezuela
Amauroderma coltricioides  T.W.Henkel, Aime & Ryvarden (2003) – Guyana
Amauroderma concentricum J.Song, Xiao L.He & B.K.Cui – China
Amauroderma congregatum Corner (1983)
Amauroderma conicum (Lloyd) Ryvarden (1990)
Amauroderma conjunctum (Lloyd) Torrend (1920) – Africa
Amauroderma dayaoshanense J.D.Zhao & X.Q.Zhang (1987) – China
Amauroderma deviatum Ryvarden (2004)
Amauroderma ealaense (Beeli) Ryvarden (1972) – Africa
Amauroderma elegantissimum Ryvarden & Iturr. (2004) – Brazil; Guyana; Venezuela
Amauroderma exile (Berk.) Torrend (1920) – South America
Amauroderma faculum Henao-M. (1997) – Colombia
Amauroderma flabellatum Aime & Ryvarden (2007) – Guyana
Amauroderma floriformum A.C.Gomes-Silva, Ryvarden & T.B.Gibertoni (2015) – Brazil
Amauroderma fujianense J.D.Zhao, L.W.Hsu & X.Q.Zhang (1979)
Amauroderma fuscatum (Lloyd) Otieno (1969)
Amauroderma fuscoporia Wakef. (1948) – Africa
Amauroderma grandisporum Gulaid & Ryvarden (1998)
Amauroderma guangxiense J.D.Zhao & X.Q.Zhang (1986)
Amauroderma hongkongense L.Fan & B.Liu (1990) – China
Amauroderma infundibuliforme Wakef. (1917) – Uganda
Amauroderma insulare (Har. & Pat.) Torrend (1920) – New Caledonia
Amauroderma intermedium (Bres. & Pat.) Torrend (1920) – Brazil; Colombia; Guadalupe; Martinique; Paraguay; Puerto Rico
Amauroderma jiangxiense J.D.Zhao & X.Q.Zhang (1987)
Amauroderma kwiluense (Beeli) Ryvarden (1974)
Amauroderma laccatostiptatum A.C.Gomes-Silva, Ryvarden & T.B.Gibertoni (2015) – Brazil
Amauroderma leptopus (Pers.) J.S.Furtado (1967) – Indonesia
Amauroderma leucosporum Corner (1983)
Amauroderma longgangense J.D.Zhao & X.Q.Zhang (1986)
Amauroderma macrosporum J.S.Furtado (1968) – Brazil
Amauroderma malesianum Corner (1983)
Amauroderma nigrum Rick (1960)
Amauroderma nutans (Fr.) Murrill (1908)
Amauroderma oblongisporum J.S.Furtado (1968) – Africa
Amauroderma omphalodes (Berk.) Torrend (1920) – Brazil; Guyana; Venezuela; Colombia
Amauroderma ovisporum A.C.Gomes-Silva, Ryvarden & T.B.Gibertoni (2015) – Brazil
Amauroderma parasiticum Corner (1983)
Amauroderma partitum (Berk.) Wakef. (1934) – Brazil; Colombia; Guyana; Venezuela
Amauroderma perplexum Corner (1983)
Amauroderma picipes Torrend (1920) – Brazil
Amauroderma praetervisum (Pat.) Torrend (1920) – Central America; South America; Cuba; Mexico
Amauroderma preussii (Henn.) Steyaert (1972)
Amauroderma pudens (Berk.) Ryvarden (1977)
Amauroderma renidens (Bres.) Torrend (1920) – Brazil
Amauroderma rude (Berk.) Torrend (1920)
Amauroderma rugosum (Blume & T.Nees) Torrend (1920)
Amauroderma salisburiense (Van der Byl) D.A.Reid (1973)
Amauroderma schomburgkii (Mont. & Berk.) Torrend (1920) – Brazil; Colombia; Costa Rica; Cuba; Guiana Francesa; Guiana; Venezuela; Jamaica; Nicarágua; Panamá; Trinidad
Amauroderma scopulosum (Berk.) Imazeki (1952)
Amauroderma secedens Corner (1983)
Amauroderma sericatum (Lloyd) Wakef. (1917)
Amauroderma sessile  A.C.Gomes-Silva, Ryvarden & T.B.Gibertoni (2015) – Brazil
Amauroderma solomonense Corner (1983)
Amauroderma sprucei (Pat.) Torrend (1920) – Brazil; Costa Rica; Colombia; Cuba; Puerto Rico; Jamaica; Belize; French Guiana; Venezuela
Amauroderma subrugosum (Bres. & Pat.) Torrend (1920)
Amauroderma subsessile A.C.Gomes-Silva, Ryvarden & T.B.Gibertoni (2015) – Brazil; Costa Rica; Panama 
Amauroderma tapetellum Henao-M. (1997) – Colombia
Amauroderma trichodematum J.S.Furtado (1968) – Bolivia; Brazil; Guyana; Venezuela
Amauroderma trulliforme (Lloyd) Torrend (1920)
Amauroderma unilaterum (Lloyd) Ryvarden (1990)
Amauroderma variabile (Berk.) Lloyd ex Wakef. (1934)
Amauroderma wuzhishanense J.D.Zhao & X.Q.Zhang (1987)
Amauroderma yunnanense J.D.Zhao & X.Q.Zhang (1987)

References

Cited literature

Further reading

 
Taxa described in 1905
Polyporales genera
Taxa named by William Alphonso Murrill